Lynne Fernie (born 1946) is a Canadian filmmaker and interdisciplinary artist. She spent fourteen years as the Canadian Spectrum programmer for the Hot Docs Festival from 2002-2016, and was described as having a passion as "deep as her knowledge," and it was said that her "championing of Canadian documentaries and the people who make them has never wavered."

Career
Fernie was the co-director with Aerlyn Weissman of the award-winning 1992 documentary film Forbidden Love: The Unashamed Stories of Lesbian Lives. They also co-directed Fiction and Other Truths: a film about Jane Rule, an award-winning biography about the author and Order of Canada recipient, Jane Rule. Her short films School's Out! (1996) and Apples and Oranges (2003)  focus on issues of bullying and homophobia in schools. Apples and Oranges, is a film which was part animation, part documentary, and is for children of an elementary school age. It addressed issues of bullying and homophobia. It was produced by the National Film Board of Canada, with Fernie as director, and Tamara Lynch as producer. In the first segment, Anta, her two moms, and all-girl band work together to overcome a bully. In the second segment, Habib and Jeroux, two skateboarders, deal with homophobia after Jeroux comes out as gay. Forbidden Love was re-released on a streaming service in 2012 to celebrate its " place as an integral part of LGBT film history."

Fernie is a member of numerous arts and LGBT organizations in Toronto. She was a co-founding collective member of the feminist periodical Fireweed and worked as editor and editor-in-chief of the artist-run centre magazine Parallélogrammefor a number of years. She was engaged with LGBTQ+ culture with the Lesbian Organization of Toronto and the Inside Out Film and Video Festival. She was a frequent songwriting lyric writer and collaborator with the pop band Parachute Club, including lyrics for the band's most famous single, "Rise Up" which was inducted into the Canadian Songwriters Hall of Fame in November 2019. She also wrote lyrics to Neon Blue, the title track for Aaron Davis'first album, and collaborated with Lorraine Segato and Richard Underhill on "Bringing All the Voices Together", a theme song for Jack Layton's campaign in the 2003 New Democratic Party leadership election.

She taught production at the film studies department at York University for eight years, and is a programmer for the Hot Docs Canadian International Documentary Festival. A portrait of Fernie, by the artist Rafy, is held by The ArQuives: Canada's LGBTQ2+ Archives' National Portrait Collection, in honour of her role as a significant builder of LGBT culture and history in Canada. She is interviewed in Matthew Hays' Lambda Literary Award-winning 2007 book The View from Here: Conversations with Gay and Lesbian Filmmakers.

Personal life
Lynne Fernie currently lives in Toronto and her visual art is available through the Oeno Gallery. She is an OCAD honours graduate in addition to being an award-winning documentary filmmaker. She has exhibited visual art and been the recipient of arts and film grants from the Canada Council, the Ontario Arts Council and the Toronto Arts Council, and has been a jury member of Canada Council and Ontario Arts Council, specifically the Lesbian and Gay Community Appeal Grant in 1997, Canada Council Research and Development Grant in 1995, the Canada Council “B” Grant in 1989, and the Canada Council Publication Assistance Grant in 1983.

Filmography

Film

Television

Awards and nominations

Exhibitions

Notes

See also
 List of female film and television directors
 List of lesbian filmmakers
 List of LGBT-related films directed by women

References

External links
 
 

1946 births
Living people
Canadian documentary film directors
Canadian songwriters
Canadian women film directors
LGBT film directors
Film directors from Toronto
Academic staff of York University
Directors of Genie and Canadian Screen Award winners for Best Documentary Film
Directors of Genie and Canadian Screen Award winners for Best Short Documentary Film
Canadian women documentary filmmakers
Canadian lesbian artists